Edward Planckaert (born 1 February 1995 in Kortrijk) is a Belgian cyclist, who currently rides for UCI ProTeam . His brothers Baptiste Planckaert and Emiel Planckaert are also cyclists.

Major results

2016
 4th Overall Tour du Loir-et-Cher
1st  Young rider classification
 5th Paris–Roubaix Espoirs
 5th Dwars door de Vlaamse Ardennen
 6th Overall Olympia's Tour
 6th Ster van Zwolle
2017
 4th Classic Loire Atlantique
 4th Grote Prijs Jean-Pierre Monseré
 10th Grote Prijs Marcel Kint
2018
 1st  Sprints classification Tour de Wallonie
 3rd Dwars door de Vlaamse Ardennen
 4th Grote Prijs Marcel Kint
 9th Clásica de Almería
 10th Fyen Rundt
2019
 1st  Mountains classification Étoile de Bessèges
 7th Clásica de Almería
 7th Ronde van Drenthe
 9th Omloop Mandel-Leie-Schelde
2020
 10th Brussels Cycling Classic
2021
 1st Stage 1 Vuelta a Burgos
2023
 1st  Sprints classification UAE Tour

Grand Tour general classification results timeline

References

External links

1995 births
Living people
Belgian male cyclists
Sportspeople from Kortrijk
Cyclists from West Flanders